Saurita arimensis is a moth in the subfamily Arctiinae. It was described by Henry Fleming in 1957. It is found in Trinidad.

References

Moths described in 1957
Saurita